Store Lenangstind or Store Lenangstinden is a mountain in Lyngen Municipality in Troms og Finnmark county, Norway. It is within the Lyngen Alps mountain range and has the fourth-highest primary factor in Norway. The Strupbreen glacier lies along the southeastern side of the mountain.

Its ascent involves easy glacier crossings, steep snow climbing, and easy rock scrambling. This peak is for experienced mountaineers only.

References

Lyngen
Mountains of Troms og Finnmark